San Lorenzo District may refer to:

Costa Rica
 San Lorenzo District, Tarrazú, in Tarrazú (canton), San José Province

Panama
 San Lorenzo District, Panama

Paraguay
 San Lorenzo District, Paraguay

Peru
 San Lorenzo District, Jauja, in Jauja Province, Junín Region

See also
 San Lorenzo (disambiguation)

District name disambiguation pages